Edward "Eddy" Newman (born 14 May 1953) is a former British politician, who served as a Member of the European Parliament (MEP).

Newman worked for the Post Office and then in light engineering.  He also became active in the Labour Party, and was elected to Manchester City Council in 1979. At the 1984 European Parliament election, he was elected to represent Greater Manchester Central. He was a member of the left wing Campaign Group.

Newman has been a councillor for Woodhouse Park on Manchester City Council since 2002 and is Chair of the Wythenshawe Community Housing Group Board. and was Lord Mayor of Manchester for 2017–18. Newman's wife Sheila (born 1955) was also a councillor in the city, representing the Chorlton ward.

References

Living people
1953 births
Politicians from Liverpool
British socialists
Councillors in Manchester
Labour Party (UK) councillors
Labour Party (UK) MEPs
MEPs for England 1984–1989
MEPs for England 1989–1994
MEPs for England 1994–1999